Louis-Albert Salingré was a French archer who competed at the 1908 Summer Olympics in London. Salingré entered the double York round event in 1908, taking 22nd place with 347 points.  He then competed in the Continental style contest, placing seventh at 215 points.

References

External links
 profile
 
 

Year of birth missing
Year of death missing
French male archers
Olympic archers of France
Archers at the 1908 Summer Olympics